Jonny Reinhardt (born 28 June 1968 in Gotha, Thuringia) is a retired German shot putter.

He represented the sports club TV Wattenscheid, and won silver medals at the German championships in 1993 and 1995. His personal best throw was 20.13 metres, achieved in June 1994 in Jena.

Achievements

References

1968 births
Living people
People from Gotha (town)
German male shot putters
Sportspeople from Thuringia
World Athletics Championships athletes for Germany